Herbert Warnke (24 February 1902 – 26 March 1975) was an East German trade unionist and politician who served as both Chairman of the Free German Trade Union Federation and a member of the Politburo of the Socialist Unity Party.

Biography
Warnke was born in Hamburg on 24 February 1902 to a working-class family. He joined the Communist Party of Germany (KPD) in 1923 and became actively involved in trade union activism. In 1932 he was elected to the Reichstag and held his seat until the Nazi seizure of power in 1933. Later that same year he became secretary of Profintern in Saarbrücken and Paris and actively opposed the Nazis during the remainder of the Interwar period. He lived in a number of countries during his exile from Nazi Germany. During World War II he was in Sweden where he worked with a number of organizations for exiled Germans.

After the defeat of the Nazis, Warnke returned to Soviet-occupied Germany and helped found the Free German Trade Union Federation (FDGB). He succeeded Hans Jendretzky as First Chairman of the organization, serving from 1948 until his death in 1975. He was elected to the Volkskammer in 1949 and was also elected to the State Council of East Germany in 1971. 

Herbert Warnke was a passionate fan of 1. FC Union Berlin.

References

1902 births
1975 deaths
Members of the Reichstag of the Weimar Republic
Members of the Politburo of the Central Committee of the Socialist Unity Party of Germany
Members of the State Council of East Germany
Members of the 1st Volkskammer
Members of the 2nd Volkskammer
Members of the 3rd Volkskammer
Members of the 4th Volkskammer
Members of the 5th Volkskammer
Members of the 6th Volkskammer
Free German Trade Union Federation members
Recipients of the Patriotic Order of Merit in gold